Nagda is a village in Udaipur district of Rajasthan state in India. It was once a prominent city in the early Mewar state. Today it is known primarily for the remains of the Sahastra Bahu Temples.

Location
Nagda is situated approximately 20 kilometers north of Udaipur or 2.5 km away from Eklingji, another sacred area.

History
Nagda was probably established by King Nagaditya of the Guhil dynasty in the 7th century AD and it was known as Nagahrada then. Nagda was the first capital of Mewar and continued to be so until c. 948 when the capital was shifted to Ahar. In c.1116, Nagda again became the capital of Mewar and stayed so until the early part of the 13th century when it was sacked by Sultan Iltutmish's forces.

Population
The population of Nagda is 237.

References 

Villages in Udaipur district
Former capitals of Mewar